The North East Collegiate Lacrosse League (NECLL) was a regional organization of non-varsity men's club field lacrosse programs in the Northeastern United States. The league was founded in 2006 by club teams from Massachusetts, Vermont, New Hampshire, and Connecticut. Like the Great Lakes Lacrosse League (GLLL) and the National College Lacrosse League (NCLL), schools that have a varsity lacrosse program may join the league. The league ceased operations prior to the 2014 season.

Current clubs 
 Saint Anselm College
 Tufts University
 UMass Amherst 'B'
 UMass Lowell
 Western New England University Jesters

Former clubs 
 University at Albany
 Bowdoin College
 Bridgewater State University
 Dartmouth College
 Harvard University
 College of the Holy Cross
 Merrimack College
 Trinity College
 University of Vermont
 Wesleyan University

NECLL Championship history 
 2006 unknown
 2007 UMass Amherst
 2008 University of Vermont
 2009 University of Vermont 
 2010 Tufts University
 2011 Tufts University
 2012 Tufts University
 2013 UMass Lowell

See also 
 California Junior College Lacrosse Association
 Great Lakes Lacrosse League
 Men's Collegiate Lacrosse Association
 National College Lacrosse League

References

External links 
 North East College Lacrosse League
 2014 NECLL LaxPower Computer Ratings 

College lacrosse leagues in the United States